Prurigo simplex is a chronic, itchy, idiopathic skin condition characterized by extremely itchy skin nodules and lesions. Typically, there is no known direct cause of prurigo simplex, but some factors are known to trigger or aggravate it. This condition falls between chronic and acute, sometimes transitioning into a chronic condition. Many people experience a recurrence of the condition after periods of remission. Middle-aged patients are the most prone age group to this condition.

Presentation
The most common prurigo simplex symptoms are skin nodules resembling insect bites that are intensely itchy. These nodules are frequently scratched open, becoming lesions that continue to itch. Sometimes the skin thickens and becomes discolored around the nodules. The scalp, arms, legs and trunk of the body are the most frequent sites of the bumps and lesions. Itching can become severe and habitual, worsening the condition and possibly causing infections in the open sores.

Treatment
Treatment is challenging, with narrow band UVB or pimozide sometimes helpful.

Prognosis

Sometimes the nodules become less itchy and eventually disappear leaving a discolored area or scar tissue. The same nodules can persist for months or even years, though, without healing. Patients may experience a remission but then relapse with new nodules forming. The condition might also become chronic, with no periods of improvement and relief.

References

 
Pruritic skin conditions